Kamadhoo (Dhivehi: ކަމަދޫ) is one of the inhabited islands of Baa Atoll.

Geography

Demography

References

Islands of the Maldives